= Akande Opeyemi Modiu =

Nigerian politician

Hon. Akande Opeyemi Modiu

Member, Oyo State House of Assembly
- Incumbent
- Assumed office 2023
- Constituency: Ibadan South-East I

Personal details
- Party: Peoples Democratic Party (PDP)
- Occupation: Politician

Akande Opeyemi Modiu is a Nigerian politician who currently represents the Ibadan South-East I Constituency at the Oyo State House of Assembly. He is a member of the Peoples Democratic Party (PDP).

== Political career ==
Akande Opeyemi Modiu was elected to represent the Ibadan South-East I Constituency in the Oyo State House of Assembly. He is a member of the state's 10th assembly and a first time member of the assembly.
